Dhurba Kumar Shahi is a Nepalese politician and serving as the Member of House of Representatives (Nepal) elected from Surkhet-1, Province No. 6. He is the member of the Nepal Communist Party.

References

Living people
Nepal MPs 2017–2022
Nepal Communist Party (NCP) politicians
Communist Party of Nepal (Unified Marxist–Leninist) politicians
1970 births